The 1936 Toledo Rockets football team was an American football team that represented Toledo University in the Ohio Athletic Conference (OAC) during the 1936 college football season. In their first season under head coach Clarence Spears, the Rockets compiled a 2–6 record. While the university new football stadium was under construction, the team played its 1936 home games at Libbey High School.

Schedule

References

Toledo
Toledo Rockets football seasons
Toledo Rockets football